Not Love Alone (also translated Not for Love Alone or Not Only Love; Russian: Не только любовь ; Ne tol'ko lyubov') is the first opera of Rodion Shchedrin, written 1961, revised in 1971.

Irina Arkhipova created the role of Varvara, and recorded Varvara's aria on her Arias recital for Melodiya 1967.

A well-known piece from this opera (usually played by cello and piano) is the humorous Quadrille from the second Act (Scene 15: The arrival of Varvara Vasilyevna and quadrille).

References

1961 operas
Russian-language operas
Operas by Rodion Shchedrin
Operas